The Escalier Daru (Daru Staircase), also referred to as Escalier de la Victoire de Samothrace, is one of the largest and most iconic interior spaces of the Louvre Palace in Paris, and of the Louvre Museum within it. Named after Pierre, Count Daru, a minister of Napoleon, and initially designed in the 1850s by Hector Lefuel as part of Napoleon III's Louvre expansion, it received its current Stripped Classicism appearance in the early 1930s. Since 1883, its focal point has been the Winged Victory of Samothrace, one of the highlights of the Louvre's collections.

Background

The Escalier Daru is the last in a series of increasingly monumental staircases built to serve this area of the Louvre building. In 1722, as the old Queen Mother's apartment on the ground floor of the Petite Galerie was being prepared to be the residence of Mariana Victoria of Spain as promised wife of Louis XV, a staircase was built to lead directly into the Salon Carré on the upper level, dubbed  after Mariana Victoria. Following her return to Spain after just three years, the Salon Carré became the venue for the yearly art show of the Académie des Beaux-Arts - thus the word  for such shows.

Shortly before his death in 1780, Louvre architect Jacques-Germain Soufflot designed a new staircase in the context of intensive planning for the creation of a public museum in the Louvre's Grande Galerie. Soufflot's design was implemented from 1781 by his successor .

The structural work was completed in 1807, but the lavish decoration designed by Percier and Fontaine took many more years and was only completed under their supervision during the Bourbon Restoration.

Lefuel's creation

From there, two monumental galleries led west and east and were to end with monumental staircases. At the western end, that was a new staircase named, like the gallery that led to it and the pavilion in which it stood, after Nicolas François, Count Mollien, another of Napoleon's ministers. At the eastern end, Lefuel initially wanted to keep Percier & Fontaine's staircase for its aesthetic value, but was overruled by Napoleon III or by his State Minister Achille Fould, who insisted on a new staircase aligned with the new composition. Lefuel had presented eight successive projects to preserve Percier and Fontaine's ensemble, but eventually gave up and dismantled most of it in 1865 to give way to the new one.

Later developments

The Escalier Daru was still unfinished at the end of the Second Empire. Its current focal point, the Winged Victory of Samothrace, was only placed at its center after Lefuel's death in 1880. The sculpture had been found in Samothrace in 1863, and shipped to Paris in 1879. It was installed in the Daru Staircase in 1883.

In 1882, Lefuel's successor  started making plans for the completion of the staircase. A team of Italian specialists created colorful mosaics for the vaulted ceilings, representing Victories holding palms and portraits of illustrious figures, on a design by painter Jules-Eugène Lenepveu.  

The final completion was designed by Louvre architect  and his successor from 1930 Albert Ferran, in the Art Deco style of the times, and executed in 1932-1934 as part of a broader museum modernization effort led by Louvre Director Henri Verne. Ferran covered the mosaics with stone-patterned wallpaper, broadened the stairs, and brought forward the Winged Victory to make it more prominent. 

In 1997, in the third phase of the Grand Louvre project, the Escalier Daru was extended downwards to serve the newly opened gallery of Archaic Greece, in what had formerly been part of the Louvre's extensive complex of mid-19th-century horse stables.

In the early 2010s, as the Winged Victory was temporarily removed for restoration, the option of uncovering the late-19th-century mosaics was considered. But it was eventually rejected by the Louvre's curators, and the staircase was kept in its mid-1930s state.

Notes

Louvre Palace
Art Deco architecture